Keola Antolin (born January 14, 1990) is a Canadian football running back who is currently a free agent. He most recently played for the BC Lions of the Canadian Football League (CFL). He played college football at Arizona.

College career
Antolin played college football at the University of Arizona from 2008 to 2011. During his career he rushed for 2,398 yards on 500 carries with 26 touchdowns. He also had 77 receptions for 508 yards and three touchdowns.

Professional career
Antolin signed with the BC Lions of the Canadian Football League in June 2014. He was released on September 8, 2015.

References

External links
BC Lions bio
Arizona Wildcats bio

1990 births
Living people
Players of American football from Honolulu
Players of Canadian football from Honolulu
American football running backs
Canadian football running backs
Arizona Wildcats football players
Tri-Cities Fever players
BC Lions players